William Baragwanath (1878–1966) was an Australian surveyor, geologist and public servant. In 1922 he was appointed director of the Geological Survey of Victoria, and in 1932 Secretary for Mines. He discovered fossils of Baragwanathia, a genus of extinct plants named in his honour, which at the time was the most ancient land plant known. He was exceptionally knowledgeable about the geology of the Australian state of Victoria.

Baragwanath married Clara Ethel, née Jones, on 9 May 1900 at a Presbyterian Church in Flemington. Together they had nine children; seven girls and two boys. He earned his degree at the Ballarat School of Mines.

References

1878 births
1966 deaths
Australian geologists